Rowshanavand or Rowshnavand or Rushanavand or Rushnawand may refer to:
 Rushnavand, Razavi Khorasan
 Rowshanavand, Birjand, South Khorasan Province